The 2009–10 season was Leeds United A.F.C.s third consecutive season in the third tier of English football which saw them finish second in League One, thus winning promotion to the Championship.

In other competitions, the club played a number of Premier League sides including a historic victory over rivals Manchester United in the FA Cup. The club's run in the FA Cup was the longest since 2003. Leeds also secured a place in the Football League Trophy area final, but lost to Carlisle United on penalties.

Simon Grayson became the first manager in four years to complete a full season as Leeds boss and celebrated it by winning the club's first promotion in twenty years. For the third season in a row, Jermaine Beckford was the club's top goalscorer with 31 goals in all competitions; Beckford was again named the League One Player of the Year, however lost out on the club's Player of the Year to Patrick Kisnorbo.

Events
This is a list of the significant events to occur at the club during the 2008–09 season, presented in chronological order (starting from 15 May 2009 and ending on the final day of the club's final match in the 2009–10 season). This list does not include transfers or new contracts, which are listed in the transfers section below, or match results, which are in the matches section.

May

15 May: The eight new academy scholars for the 2009–10 season are revealed to be: James Baxendale, Jonathan Birbeck, James Booker, Alex Cairns, Joe McCann, Sanchez Payne, Lewis Turner and Nathan Turner.
26 May: The club's top goalscorer in the 2008–09 season, Jermaine Beckford, rejects a three-year contract offer from the club. As a result, the club put the player on the transfer list.

June

17 June: The League One fixtures for the 2009–10 season are released with Leeds' first match against Exeter City at Elland Road. The final game of the season will be against Bristol Rovers at home.

July
2 July: The players return to Thorp Arch for pre-season training.
8 July: The club state that they will be investigating the circumstances surrounding academy product Luke Garbutt's move to Everton.
9 July: The club announce that they have rejected bids from two Premier League clubs for starlet Fabian Delph. They also reveal that they have rejected unacceptable bids for Jermaine Beckford.
17 July: Jermaine Beckford is taken off the transfer list.
24 July: The squad numbers for the new season are announced. Richard Naylor is given the number 6 shirt replacing Ľubomír Michalík who moves to number 17. Paul Huntington swaps to number 24 with Patrick Kisnorbo taking his number 3 shirt. Meanwhile, new recruits Jason Crowe and Shane Higgs take the number 2 and 12 jerseys respectively.
31 July: Richard Naylor is appointed the new club captain.

August
4 August: Chairman, Ken Bates revealed that the club had agreed a fee with Manchester City for Fabian Delph; however City needed to have the bid approved by their owners in the Gulf and required a week to do so. As a result, Leeds rejected City's bid and accepted another bid from Aston Villa. Delph later agreed terms with Villa and was transferred for a fee worth up to £8 million.
6 August: Jonny Howson is announced as the new club vice-captain.

September
5 September: The 2–0 home win against Stockport County sees the club record their best ever start to a season with eight successive victories; the previous best start to a season was in 1973 – the season in which Don Revie won his second First Division title as manager of Leeds. Another club record is beaten with the victory the club's fourteenth successive home league win.
17 September: Leeds City Council offer to re-purchase the club's training ground, Thorp Arch, which was sold by the club to businessman Jacob Adler in 2004. The deal would see the Council renting Thorp Arch to the club with an option for the club to purchase the facility at the end of the lease.

October
16 October: The club announce that they chose not to exercise the option of re-purchasing Thorp Arch from Barnaway Ltd. before the 23:59 deadline on 15 October.

December
16 December: The club's stadium, Elland Road is chosen as one of the fourteen venues for the 2018 World Cup should England be successful in being chosen as the host country.

January
3 January: Leeds United make FA Cup history by becoming the first team outside the Premier League to eliminate Manchester United in Alex Ferguson's managerial career. In doing so, Leeds ended a 29-year streak without a win at Old Trafford.
6 January: The club confirm that Jermaine Beckford handed in a transfer request on 30 December and that the request was accepted.
17 January: Jermaine Beckford withdraws his transfer request, committing himself to the club until the end of his contract at the end of the current season.

February
9 February: Three Leeds players are punched by opposition fans after the club lose to Carlisle United on penalties in the Football League Trophy area final second leg.

March
13 March: The club's youth team finish the Emirates Airlines Dubai Sevens tournament as runners-up having beaten Arsenal, Blackburn Rovers and Celtic in previous rounds. The team lost 2–0 to Olympiacos in the final.

April
3 April: Striker Trésor Kandol is fined by the club after being sent off for violent conduct just twenty seconds after coming on the field of play as a substitute in the 1–0 defeat to Norwich City. The red card is the second Kandol has received this season having been sent-off after the final whistle for violent conduct earlier on in the season.
17 April: The club qualify for the League One 2009–10 play-offs after 7th place Colchester United lose to Hartlepool United. Even if Colchester win all of their three remaining games and Leeds lose all of theirs, Colchester would still be three points adrift of Leeds in the final league table.

May
8 May: The club come second in the league and thus finally secure automatic promotion to The Championship after a nailbiting season finale against Bristol Rovers. With Max Gradel sent off in the first half and the club conceding a goal early in the second half, the Leeds fans feared that they would have to settle for a play-off place; but Jonathan Howson and Jermaine Beckford each scored within four minutes to make the score 2–1 to Leeds and secure their promotion.

Players

Squad information

Appearances (starts and substitute appearances) and goals include those in The Championship (and playoffs), League One (and playoffs), FA Cup, League Cup and Football League Trophy.
1Player first came to the club on loan and was transferred the following year.
2Player joined the club in 2008 as a scholar. He is presently a 2nd year scholar and is not currently signed to the club on professional terms.
Squad includes players registered with the club on the last day of the season (8 May 2010) only.

Squad stats

Captains

Assists 

Last updated:10 May 2010
Source:

Disciplinary record

Suspensions

Transfers

In

1Transfer fee was officially undisclosed, however it was reported by The Times that the fee was £250,000.
2The club has the option of extending the player's contact by an additional year.

Loans In

Loans Out

Out

1The Professional Football Compensation Committee decided that Everton should pay Leeds an initial compensation fee of £600,000 followed by £200,000 upon Garbutt's first full international appearance and £150,000 after the player has made 5, 10, 20, 30 and 40 appearances (thus totalling  £750,000 from this final clause). It was also ruled that Leeds should receive 20% of any profit that Everton makes from future sale of the player.
2Transfer fee was officially undisclosed, however it was reported by The Guardian that the fee was approximately an upfront £6 million with an additional £2 million in variables.
3The total compensation fee for the two academy players was reported to be £800,000.

New Contracts

Pre-season

Competitions

League One

Table

Results summary

Results by round

League One

FA Cup

League Cup

Football League Trophy

Awards

Internal Awards

Official Player of the Year Awards

The results of the 2009–10 Leeds United A.F.C. Player of the Year Awards were announced at a dinner on 8 May 2010 at Elland Road.

Player of the Year:  Patrick Kisnorbo
Young Player of the Year: Aidan White
Players' Player of the Year: Patrick Kisnorbo
Goal of the Season: Jermaine Beckford (vs Manchester United, 3 January)
Best Contribution to Community: Leigh Bromby, Jonathan Howson and Ben Parker
Chairman's Special Award: Ben Parker

External Awards

League One Team of the Week
The following Leeds players have been selected in the official League One team of the week.

10 August: Jermaine Beckford, Michael Doyle
17 August: Shane Higgs, Andy Hughes
24 August: Jason Crowe, Bradley Johnson
31 August: Jermaine Beckford, Bradley Johnson
7 September: Jason Crowe
21 September: Jonny Howson, Bradley Johnson
28 September: Patrick Kisnorbo
2 November: Richard Naylor
23 November: Jermaine Beckford, Neil Kilkenny, Robert Snodgrass
7 December: Robert Snodgrass
21 December: Leigh Bromby, Robert Snodgrass
1 February: Jermaine Beckford, Richard Naylor
8 February: Luciano Becchio
6 April: Richard Naylor
26 April: Luciano Becchio

Other Awards
PFA Team of the Year (League One): Patrick Kisnorbo, Robert Snodgrass
PFA Fans' Player of the Month (League One): Robert Snodgrass (August/September), Jermaine Beckford (October, December)
League One Player of the Year: Jermaine Beckford
LMA Performance of the Week Award: vs Manchester United (3 January, 1–0, FA Cup)
Johnstone's Paint Trophy Ultimate Finish Award: Neil Kilkenny (vs Accrington Stanley, 15 December)
Yorkshire Evening Post Player of the Year (Leeds United): Patrick Kisnorbo

References

External links

Official Website
Sky Sports
Soccerbase
ESPNsoccernet 

Leeds United
Leeds United F.C. seasons
Foot